Sardinella is a genus of fish in the family Clupeidae found in the Atlantic, Indian and Pacific Ocean. They are abundant in warmer waters of the tropical and subtropical oceans. Adults are generally coastal, schooling, marine fish but juveniles are often found in lagoons and estuaries. These species are distinguished by their ranges and by specific body features, but they are often confused with one another. Fish of the genus have seven to 14 striped markings along the scales of the top of the head. The paddle-shaped supramaxilla bones are characteristic; they separate Sardinella from other genera and their shapes help distinguish species. They have paired predorsal scales and enlarged fin rays.

Species
There are currently 24 recognized species in this genus:
 Sardinella albella (Valenciennes, 1847) (White sardinella)
 Sardinella atricauda (Günther, 1868) (Bleeker's blacktip sardinella)
 Sardinella aurita Valenciennes, 1847 (Round sardinella)
 Sardinella brachysoma Bleeker, 1852 (Deep-body sardinella)
 Sardinella brasiliensis (Steindachner, 1879) (Brazilian sardinella)
 Sardinella electra Hata & Motomura, 2019 
 Sardinella fijiense (Fowler & B. A. Bean, 1923) (Fiji sardinella)
 Sardinella fimbriata (Valenciennes, 1847) (Fringe-scale sardinella)
 Sardinella gibbosa (Bleeker, 1849) (Gold-stripe sardinella)
 Sardinella goni Stern, Rinkevich & Goren, 2016 (Gon's sardinella) 
 Sardinella hualiensis (K. Y. Chu & C. F. Tsai, 1958) (Taiwan sardinella)
 Sardinella jussieu (Lacépède, 1803) (Mauritian sardinella)
 Sardinella lemuru Bleeker, 1853 (Bali sardinella)
 Sardinella longiceps Valenciennes, 1847 (Indian sardinella)
 Sardinella maderensis (R. T. Lowe, 1838) (Madeiran sardinella)
 Sardinella marquesensis Berry & Whitehead, 1968 (Marquesan sardinella)
 Sardinella melanura (G. Cuvier, 1829) (Black-tip sardinella)
 Sardinella neglecta Wongratana, 1983 (East African sardinella)
 Sardinella pacifica Hata & Motomura, 2019 
 Sardinella richardsoni Wongratana, 1983 (Richardson's sardinella)
 Sardinella rouxi (Poll, 1953) (Yellow-tail sardinella)
 Sardinella sindensis (F. Day, 1878) (Sind sardinella)
 Sardinella tawilis (Herre, 1927) (Fresh-water sardinella)
 Sardinella zunasi (Bleeker, 1854) (Japanese sardinella)

References

 
Clupeidae
Extant Eocene first appearances
Marine fish genera
Taxa named by Achille Valenciennes